Dan Bryant may refer to:

 Dan Bryant (minstrel) (1833–1875, stage name of Dan  O'Neill), member of Bryant's Minstrels, an American blackface minstrel troupe
 Dan Bryant (mountaineer) (1905–1957, nickname of Leslie Vickery Bryant), New Zealand mountaineer
 Dan Bryant (singer), member of American heavy metal band Cacophony